The Zomet Institute (Makhon Tzomet, Tzomet being an acronym for Tzevtei Mada veTorah, lit. Teams of Science and Torah) is an Israeli high-tech non-profit organization specializing in IT equipment and electronic appliances designed to meet Halakha.

The company
The Zomet Institute was established in Alon Shvut by Yisrael Rosen (1941-2017), who also founded and headed the Administration of Conversion to Judaism of the Chief Rabbinate of Israel. Later, he served as a Dayan - Rabbinic Judge on the Beit Din for Conversion.

The company has developed solutions for operating electrical appliances on the Shabbat and other Jewish holidays. Appliances made by the institute are used in Jewish observant homes, as well as in public organizations such as hospitals, the Israel Police and the Israel Defense Forces.

Although the Zomet Institute is affiliated with Modern Orthodox Judaism, Rozen often consults other rabbis and his halachic rulings have received endorsements from authorities including the late Rabbi Shlomo Zalman Auerbach and Rabbi Yehoshua Neuwirth.

See Also 
Sabbath Mode - For features implemented with the same goal by manufacturers not necessarily associated with Zomet.

Publications
 Tehumin - an annual compilation of psakim (religious rulings dealing with modern Jewish life, technology and law). Published since 1980 (5740)
 Crossroads: Halacha and the Modern World - An English translation of Selected articles from Tehumin
 Shabbat B'Shabbato - A weekly leaflet in Hebrew distributed for the past two decades in synagogues across Israel.  Shabbat B'Shabbato is also translated into English.

References

External links
Official website 
Bringing “Oneg Shabbat” to People With Disabilities, Noah D. Gurock, Orthodox Jewish Occupational Therapy Chavrusa
Gadgets help Jews stay observant in modern world, Adrian Flucuş, Soft32.com
Entrepreneurs Find Ways to Make Technology Work With Jewish Sabbath, New York Times
Shabbat B'Shabbato in English

Electronics companies of Israel
Jewish law and rituals
Judaism and science
Modern Orthodox Judaism in Israel
Religious Zionism
Shabbat innovations